Hamzeh Kanlu (also Romanized as Ḩamzeh Kānlū; also known as Ḩamzeh Kānlū-ye Bālā and Ḩamzeh Kānlū-ye ‘Olyā) is a village in Dowlatkhaneh Rural District, Bajgiran District, Quchan County, Razavi Khorasan Province, Iran. At the 2006 census, its population was 92, in 23 families.

References 

Populated places in Quchan County